is a Japanese motorcycle racer. He has competed in the GP125 and J-GP3 classes of the All Japan Road Race Championship.

Career statistics

Grand Prix motorcycle racing

By season

Races by year
(key)

References

External links
 Profile on MotoGP.com

Japanese motorcycle racers
Living people
1992 births
125cc World Championship riders